This is a list of rural localities in Ulyanovsk Oblast. Ulyanovsk Oblast (Ulyanovskaya oblast) is a federal subject of Russia (an oblast). It is located in the Volga Federal District. Its administrative center is the city of Ulyanovsk. Population: 1,292,799 (2010 Census).

Locations 
 Bolshoye Nagatkino
 Novaya Malykla
 Shakhovskoye
 Stogovka

See also 
 
 Lists of rural localities in Russia

References 

Ulyanovsk Oblast